Chip R. Bell is an American author and consultant in customer loyalty and service innovation. He is known for his work in mapping the customer journey as part of the customer service experience and customer forensics.

Education
Chip Bell earned a bachelor's degree in psychology and political science from the University of Georgia, a masters in Behavioral Science from Vanderbilt University and a doctorate in Organizational Behavior/Human Resource Development from The George Washington University.

Military service
Chip Bell served as an infantry unit commander with the 82nd Airborne Division during the Vietnam War   
 and was a guerilla tactics instructor at the U.S. Army Infantry School at Fort Benning. Bell was awarded 2 Bronze Stars, 2 Purple Hearts, 2 Air Medals, and several other medals in recognition of valor.

Publications
Bell has authored or co-authored twenty-four books, of which nine have been described as national and international best-sellers. A book about innovative service, entitled Sprinkles: Creating Awesome Experiences Through Innovative Service, has been described by one reviewer as "stand[ing] out from the crowd”. Other books have been described by the same reviewer as "smart, succinct, accessible, and practical." In February 2017, Bell published a book entitled Kaleidoscope: Delivering Innovative Service that Sparkles. His newest book is Inside Your Customer's Imagination: 5 Secrets for Creating Breakthrough Products, Services, and Solutions.

Bibliography
 Inside Your Customer's Imagination: 5 Secrets for Creating Breakthrough Products, Services, and Solutions Berrett-Koehler Publishers (2020); .
 Book Mark: How to Be an Author Georgia Writer's Museum (2019); .
 Kaleidoscope: Delivering Innovative Service that Sparkles Greenleaf Book Group (2017); 
 Sprinkles: Creating Awesome Experiences Through Innovative Service Greenleaf Book Group (2015); 
 Managers as Mentors: Building Partnerships for Learning, 3rd Edition (with Marshall Goldsmith), Berrett-Koehler Publishers (2013); 
 The 9½ Principles of Innovative Service, Simple Truths (2013)
 Wired and Dangerous: How Your Customers Have Changed and What to Do About It (with John R. Patterson), Berrett-Koehler Publishers (2011); .
 Take Their Breath Away: How Imaginative Service Creates Devoted Customers with John R. Patterson, John Wiley & Sons (2009)
 Customer Loyalty Guaranteed: Create, Lead and Sustain Remarkable Customer Service (with John R. Patterson), Adams Business (2007); 
 Magnetic Service: Secrets for Creating Passionately Devoted Customers (with Bilijack R. Bell), Berrett-Koehler Publishers (2006); .
Beep! Beep!: Competing in the Age of the Road Runner (with Oren Harari), Warner Books (2000); 
 Knock Your Socks Off Service Recovery with Ron Zemke AMACOM (2000)
 Service Magic: The Art of Amazing Your Customers (with Ron Zemke), Dearborn Trade (2003); 
 Customer Love: Attracting and Keeping Customers for Life Executive Excellence Publishing (2001); 
 Dance Lessons: Six Steps to Great Partnership in Business and Life (with Heather Shea), Berrett-Koehler Publishers (1998); .
Customers as Partners-Building Relationships That Last: Building Relationships That Last, Berrett-Koehler Publishers (1994); .
 Managing Knock Your Socks Off Service with Ron Zemke, AMACOM (1992)
 Service Wisdom: Creating and Maintaining the Customer Service Edge (with Ron Zemke), Lakewoods Pubns (1989); 
 Understanding Training: Perspectives and Practices (with Fredric Margolis), Pfeiffer & Co (1989); 
 The Trainer’s Professional Development Handbook (with Ray Bard and Leslie Stephen), Wiley (publisher) (1987); 
 Instructing for Results (with Fredric Margolis), Pfeiffer & Co (1986); 
 Clients and Consultants: Meeting and Exceeding Expectations (with Leonard Nadler), UNKNO (1985);

Awards
 Global Gurus World's Top 30 Customer Experience Professionals for 2022
 Top 30 Thought Leaders in North America - Leadership Excellence Magazine
 Leadership 500 Excellence Award, 2016
 Leadership Excellence 100 Top Thought Leaders for 2008
 2018 Bronze Stevie Award for Innovative Customer Service Training Design

Book awards
 Bronze Award for Business Innovation Books, Axiom Business Book Awards (2021)
 Bronze Award for Top Sales Book, Axiom Business Book Awards (2012)
 Silver Award for Top Business/Career/Sales; Independent Publisher Awards (2011)
 Top Business Book; Benjamin Franklin Award Winner; IBPA (2004)
 Finalist, National Indie Excellence Award (2018)
 Best Book Award - Business: Marketing & Advertising (2017); AmericanBookFest  
 Benjamin Franklin Award (2004); Independent Book Publishers Association

References

External links
Official website

Living people
American business writers
American management consultants
Business speakers
Year of birth missing (living people)